PIttsburgh Phantoms may refer to:

Pittsburgh Phantoms (NPSL) - a professional soccer team which played in 1967.
Pittsburgh Phantoms (RHI) - a professional roller hockey team which played in 1994.
Pittsburgh Phantoms (ABA) - a professional basketball team which played in 2009-10.